The 1984 National Camogie League is a competition in the women's team field sport of camogie was won by Cork, who defeated Dublin in the final, played at Ballinlough.

Arrangements
Dublin won their group outright with three new forwards in their squad, Ann Colgan, Marie O'Connell and Carmel O'Byrne. Cork were held to a draw against Tipperary but beat Limerick to top the other group. Agnes Hourigan wrote in the Irish Press: Cork moved Marion Conroy to full back early in the campaign and Angela Higgins got a new life with her chance at number 12.

The Final
Dublin led 0–3 to 0–2 at half-time in a disappointing final but Cork took command when Mary O'Leary deflected the ball to the net at the start of the second half. It was described as Dublin's poorest showing for many years. Clare Cronin moved to centre forward where she opened up the game for the other forwards. Six Cork points followed and Dublin's only reply was a point from Carmel O'Byrne. Agnes Hourigan wrote in the Irish Press: Cork played for a quarter an hour and won, Dublin did not play at all. Both sides must have asked themselves over and over again how they could have been so bad. Cork had the better of things at midfield and missed the services of the injured Edel Murphy. But their forwards squandered chance after chance. Dublin’s teams of the fifties and early sixties were renowned for their teamwork. Their side on Sunday lacked any plan or leadership. Both counties have an uphill climb to prepare for the championship.
Dublin went on to win the All-Ireland title three months later, defeating Tipperary in the final.

Division 2
The Junior National League, known since 2006 as Division Two, was won by Dublin’s second team who defeated Armagh in the final. The league was divided into five sections, and Armagh, relying on Patricia Daly, Sally McCone, Ursula McGivern, and Rita McColgan defeated Derry to win their section and Cavan by 3-7 to 1-3 to qualify for the final. Dublin defeated Tyrone in the semi-final.

Final stages

References

External links
 Camogie Association

National Camogie League
1984